The Chanchán River is a river of Ecuador.

See also
List of rivers of Ecuador

References
 Rand McNally, The New International Atlas, 1993.
  GEOnet Names Server 
 Water Resources Assessment of Ecuador

Rivers of Ecuador
Geography of Chimborazo Province